Seydelia geometrica is a moth in the family Erebidae. It was described by Oberthür in 1883. It is found in Eritrea and Ethiopia.

References

Natural History Museum Lepidoptera generic names catalog

Moths described in 1883
Spilosomina